"Sick of Being Lonely" is a song written and performed by American hip hop group Field Mob, issued as the official lead single from their second studio album From tha Roota to tha Toota. It was the group's first entry on the Billboard Hot 100, peaking at #18 in 2002.

Music video

The official music video for "Sick of Being Lonely" was directed by Jeremy Rall.

Chart positions

Weekly charts

Year-end charts

References

External links
 
 

2001 songs
2002 singles
Field Mob songs
MCA Records singles
Music videos directed by Jeremy Rall
Song recordings produced by Jazze Pha